Mango Publishing is an American book publisher founded in 2014.

Company history
Mango Publishing was founded by Christopher McKenney in 2014 as an independent book publisher in Miami, Florida. In both 2019 and 2020, Mango was named the fastest growing independent publisher in the United States by Publishers Weekly. The company has a revenue sharing model with its authors, where it provides up to 50% of net sales to its writers.

Books and imprints
The company publishes books in a variety of genres including non-fiction, young adult, children, self-help, business, science, pop-culture, social justice, LGBTQ, feminism, fiction and poetry. It publishes more than one hundred titles per year. It also partners with companies like Franklin Covey to create add-on books products like themed playing card decks. In 2019 the company acquired Conari Press and in 2020 they acquired Yellow Pear Press. Their additional imprints include Books and Books Press, FIU Business Press, D.O.P.E (Dreams on Paper Entertainment), the Tiny Press, and Reef Smart Guides.

References

Book publishing companies based in Florida
Companies based in Miami
American companies established in 2014
2014 establishments in Florida